The Beatles' Long Tall Sally is an album by the English rock band the Beatles, their final album to be released exclusively in Canada. It was a mono release on the Capitol Records label (catalogue number T 6063) in May 1964.

After the release of this album, Beatles' records in Canada would match the group's United States releases, starting with the United Artists version of the A Hard Day's Night album, and, on Capitol, Something New. This was done under orders from Capitol president Alan W. Livingston. Earlier American Beatle album releases were also issued in Canada.

This album borrows its name—and two tracks—from the Beatles' British EP Long Tall Sally. Four of the tracks had already been released on the Canadian album Beatlemania! With the Beatles.

The cover design is almost identical to the US release The Beatles' Second Album.

Track listing
All songs written by Lennon–McCartney, except where noted.

Side one
"I Want to Hold Your Hand" – 2:24
"I Saw Her Standing There" – 2:50
"You Really Got a Hold on Me" (Smokey Robinson) – 3:00
"Devil in Her Heart" (Richard P. Drapkin) – 2:28
"Roll Over Beethoven" (Chuck Berry) – 2:46
"Misery" – 1:48

Side two
"Long Tall Sally" (Enotris Johnson, Richard Penniman, Robert Blackwell) – 2:03
"I Call Your Name" – 2:10
"Please Mr. Postman" (Robert Bateman, Georgia Dobbins, William Garrett, Fred Gorman, Brian Holland) – 2:37
"This Boy" – 2:10
"I'll Get You" – 2:04
"You Can't Do That" – 2:34

Certifications

Reissue
The album was deleted in 1967 but was reissued in 1971 along with the two other unique Canadian Beatles albums in Capitol's "6000 Series". The album was issued in stereo for the first time in 1976, though nearly all the "stereo" tracks are in the "reprocessed for stereo" format. This process involves creating a "dual mono/simulated stereo" sound by emphasizing the higher frequencies on the right channel and lower frequency on the left.

References

External links
The Beatles in Canada

1964 albums
Albums produced by George Martin
The Beatles albums
Capitol Records albums